Westport Country Playhouse notable performers include

1933: Kitty Carlisle in Champagne Sec
1934: Burgess Meredith in Hide and Seek
1935: Ruth Gordon in The Country Wife
1936:
Eva Le Gallienne in Love for Love and Camille
Dorothy Gish in Russet Mantle
1937: Henry Fonda in The Virginian
1938: Ethel Barrymore in The Constant Wife
1939:
Gene Kelly, Betty Comden, and Adolph Green in Magazine Page
Ruth Gordon in Here Today
1940: Paul Robeson in The Emperor Jones
1941: Tyrone Power in Liliom directed by Lee Strasberg.
1942–1945:The Westport Country Playhouse closed because of World War II
1946:
June Havoc in They Knew What They Wanted
Olivia de Havilland in What Every Woman Knows
Thornton Wilder as the stage manager for Our Town
1947: Tallulah Bankhead in Private Lives
1948: Thornton Wilder in The Skin of Our Teeth
1949:
Helen Hayes and Mary MacArthur in Good Housekeeping
Carl Reiner in Pretty Penny
1950:
Maureen Stapleton in My Fiddle Has Three Strings
Maurice Evans in The Devil's Disciple
Franchot Tone in The Second Man
Basil Rathbone in The Winslow Boy
1951:
Claudette Colbert in Island Fling
Olivia de Havilland in Candida
1952: John Forsythe in Dangerous Corner and The Hasty Heart
1953:
Eva Gabor in Sailor's Delight and The Play's the Thing
Lillian Gish in The Trip to Bountiful
1954:
Imogene Coca in Happy Birthday
Richard Kiley in Candle-Light
1955:
Richard Kiley in Heaven Can Wait
Eva Marie Saint in The Rainmaker (play)
1956:
Lillian Gish and Dorothy Gish in The Chalk Garden
Bea Lillie in Beasop's Fables
1957:
Eartha Kitt in Mrs. Patterson
Jessica Tandy and Hume Cronyn in Man in the Dog Suit
1958:
Groucho Marx in A Time for Elizabeth
Bert Lahr in Visit to a Small Planet
1959:
Eli Wallach and Anne Jackson in The Glass Menagerie
Tony Randall in Arms and the Man
1960:
Joan Fontaine in Susan and God
Jane Fonda in No Concern of Mine
Mike Nichols and Elaine May in An Evening with Mike Nichols and Elaine May
1961:
Cyril Ritchard and Cornelia Otis Skinner in The Pleasure of His Company
Gloria Swanson in Between Seasons
1962:
Tallulah Bankhead in Here Today
Sammy Davis Jr. in The Desperate Hours
1963:
Teresa Wright in Tchin-Tchin
Carol Channing in The Millionairess
Hermione Gingold in Oh Dad, Poor Dad, Mamma's Hung You in the Closet and I'm Feelin' So Sad
1964:
Joel Grey in Stop the World – I Want to Get Off
Helen Hayes in The White House
1965:
Michael Allinson, Dina Merrill, Lois Nettleton, and Bramwell Fletcher in the George Bernard Shaw Repertory Festival
Tammy Grimes in The Private Ear and the Public Eye
Joan Fontaine in The Unexpected Guest
1966:
Cicely Tyson and Alan Alda in The Owl and the Pussycat
Tom Ewell in Life With Father
1967:
Barbara Bel Geddes in Wait Until Dark
E. G. Marshall in A Singular Man
Betsy Palmer in Luv
1968:
Geraldine Page in The Little Foxes
Shirley Booth in Desk Set
1969: Keir Dullea and Maureen O'Sullivan in Butterflies Are Free
1970:
Noel Harrison in Blithe Spirit
Shirley Booth in Best of Friends
1971:
Colleen Dewhurst in The Big Coca Cola Swamp in the Sky
Geraldine Page and Rip Torn in Marriage & Money
1972:
Mickey Rooney in See How They Run
Robert Stack in Remember Me
1973:
José Ferrer in A Song for Cyrano
Art Carney in The Prisoner of Second Avenue
1974: Jack Gilford and Lou Jacobi in The Sunshine Boys
1975:
Lynn Redgrave in The Two of Us
Theodore Bikel in The Good Doctor
Tammy Grimes in In Praise of Love
1976: Eva Marie Saint in Fatal Weakness
1977: Jane Alexander and Richard Kiley in The Master Builder
1978:
Douglas Fairbank, Jr. in Out on a Limb
Louis Jordan in 13 Rue De L'Amour
1979: Vincent Price in Diversions & Delights
1980:
Sada Thompson in Children
Richard Thomas in Whose Life is it Anyway?
1981: Eva Le Gallienne in To Grandmother's House We Go
1982: Eileen Heckart in What I Did Last Summer
1983: Shelley Winters in 84, Charing Cross Road
1984: Betsy Palmer in Breakfast with Les and Bess
1985: Christopher Walken and Katharine Houghton in A Bill of Development
1986: Colleen Dewhurst in Real Estate
1987: George Grizzard in The Perfect Party
1988: Arlene Francis and David Birney in Social Security
1989: Elizabeth Ashley in All the Queen's Men
1990: Fritz Weaver and Elizabeth Wilson in The Cocktail Hour
1991: Juliet Mills in Dangerous Obsession
1992: Tony Roberts in The Fourth Wall
1993: Charles Cioffi in The Substance of Fire
1994: Elaine May and Gene Saks in Intimate Exchanges
1996: Charles Durning, James Handy, and Dan Lauria in Men in Suits
1997: Jean Powell, Anne Meara, Jerry Stiller and Paul Benedict in After-Play
1998: Jean Stapleton in Eleanor - Her Secret Journey
1999:
James Naughton in Street of Dreams
Michael Learned and Ralph Waite in Chasing Monsters
2000:
Paul Newman, Joanne Woodward, James Naughton, Swoosie Kurtz, Jane Curtin and Fritz Weaver in Ancestral Voices
Bronson Pinchot in Nicolette & Aucassin
2001:
Gene Wilder in Don't Make Me Laugh
Leslie Uggams and Bruce Weitz in Heaven Can Wait
Karen Allen and Chad Allen in Temporary Help
2002: Paul Newman, Jayne Atkinson, Frank Converse, Jane Curtin and Jeffrey DeMunn in Our Town
2006: James Earl Jones in Thurgood

Notes

Lists of musicians
Westport, Connecticut
Theatre companies in Connecticut